Anthony Michael Oller (born February 25, 1991) is an American singer, songwriter and actor. He had roles as Walt Moore on the TeenNick TV show Gigantic, and as Danny on Disney Channel's As the Bell Rings. He appeared in the films Beneath the Darkness and The Purge. He was also half of the group MKTO with his co-star Malcolm David Kelley, before leaving the group in 2021.

Early life 
Oller was raised in Houston, Texas, the son of Mary Anne (née Brown) and Jeff Oller.  He graduated with honors in Debate from Cy-Fair High School in 2009.

Career

Acting career
He appeared in both seasons of the Disney Channel short comedy series As the Bell Rings as Danny. The show consisted of short episodes that showed during commercial breaks and took place in a single high school hallway where the character hang out between classes, and the show was originally based off of Italy's short form TV series "Quelli dell'Intervallo". As The Bell Rings features three original songs recorded by Oller. His first song/music video "Could You Be The One" premiered August 2, 2008, on the Disney Channel followed by "Here I Go" and "All You Gotta Do". He also appeared on Savannah Outen's music video for her single, "If You Only Knew".

In 2010, Oller had a supporting role in the Lifetime drama movie Unanswered Prayers, which was based on a song by Garth Brooks. He also appeared in the TeenNick series Gigantic as Walt Moore. This is where he met Malcolm David Kelley, who later became one half of the pop-duo MKTO. In 2011, Oller starred in the NBC's TV movie Field of Vision. The movie was about a high-school football player (Tony Oller) who must make a difficult decision regarding bullies.

Later in 2011, Oller guest starred in an episode of CSI: NY. He had a lead role in the 2012 horror thriller film Beneath the Darkness.. In 2013 he starred as Henry in the horror thriller film The Purge. 2014, he appeared with his band mate Malcolm David Kelley on the series The Thundermans as himself.

In 2016, Oller appeared as Ian in romantic series Relationship Status co-starring Mekenna Melvin, which premiered on Go90 app.

MKTO 
In 2012, Oller and his former Gigantic co-star Malcolm David Kelley joined up to form the pop duo MKTO. The group signed to Columbia Records and released their debut single "Thank You" on January 15, 2013. The single reached number 2 on the Australian charts. and number 7 on the New Zealand charts. In 2013 their single "Classic" was released with a music video and saw the song peak at number 14 on the Billboard Hot 100. Their debut album was released on April 1, 2014 and saw the album peak at number 31 on the Billboard 200.

On June 2, 2015, MKTO released the lyric video of their new single, "Bad Girls". On June 5, 2015, the video for "Bad Girls" was released. It also appeared as #21 on the iTunes pop charts.  A double A-side single including two brand new tracks "Hands Off My Heart/Places You Go" was premiered exclusively on Billboard on March 9, 2016. On March 10, 2017, Tony Oller announced on Twitter that the band had broken up. However, in September 2017, the band had announced that they were working on their second studio album.

In August 2021, Oller announced that he had parted ways with the band.

Filmography

Film

Television

Web

Discography

Singles

References

External links

1991 births
American male child actors
21st-century American male actors
American male television actors
American singer-songwriters
Living people
21st-century American singers
Columbia Records artists